Le Mesurier, LeMesurier, Lemesurier, Le Masurier and Le Messurier are variant spellings of a surname originating in the Channel Islands.  Notable people with the name include:

 Gerald Le Mesurier (1914–1943), South African flying ace of World War II
 Henry LeMessurier (1848–1931), Newfoundland civil servant and politician
 James Le Mesurier (1971–2019), British army officer and co-founder of the White Helmets
 Joan Le Mesurier (1932–2021), English actress
 John Le Masurier (fl. 1950s - 1960s), British athletics coach
 John Le Mesurier (1912–1983), English actor
 John Le Mesurier (born 1933/34), English carpet salesman and alleged conspirator in the Thorpe affair
 John Le Mesurier (Alderney) (1781–1843), last hereditary governor of Alderney, Channel Islands
 John Lemesurier (1826–1891), Canadian politician
 Kathleen Le Messurier (fl. 1932), Australian tennis player
 Nicolas Le Messurier (fl. 1960s), American sound engineer
 Paul Le Mesurier (1755 – 9 December 1805), British merchant, politician and Lord Mayor of London
 Robert Le Masurier (1913–1996), Bailiff of Jersey, Channel Islands
 Robin Le Mesurier (1953–2021), British guitarist
 Thomas Le Mesurier (priest, born 1756) (1756–1822), British lawyer, cleric and polemicist
 Thomas Le Mesurier (aviator) (1897–1918), British World War I flying ace
 William LeMessurier (1926–2007), American structural engineer